The Kamuli–Bukungu Road is a road in the Eastern Region of Uganda, connecting the towns of Kamuli in Kamuli District to Bukungu in Buyende District, on the shores of Lake Kyoga, adjacent to where the Victoria Nile enters that lake. This road, together with the connecting Jinja-Kamuli-Mbulamuti Road form a continuous transport corridor, connecting the northern shores of Lake Nalubaale to the southern shores of Lake Kyoga.

Location
The geographical coordinates of the road at the town of Iringa are: 01°16'18.0"N, 33°01'44.0"E
(Latitude:1.271667; Longitude:33.028889).

Overview
This is a rural road that passes through some of the poorest neighborhoods in the country. As of July 2021, the entire road is gravel surface in various stages of disrepair. During the dry season, it is potholed and dusty. Then when it rains the road is slippery, gullied and muddy. The government of Uganda has listed this road on the to-do list since 2001, but tarmacking has not ben effected.

Upgrade to bitumen surface
In 2021 the Uganda National Roads Authority (UNRA) began the process of procuring a contractor to improve the road to class II bitumen standard, with shoulders, culverts and drainage channels. UNRA views the entire  Jinja-Bukungu Road as one project. However, UNRA will tender the Jinja-Kamuli section separately from the Kamuli-Bukungu section; two separate contractors will be hired.

References

External links
UNRA set to work on Jinja-Kamuli road As of 29 April 2021.

Roads in Uganda
Buyende District
Kamuli District
Busoga
Eastern Region, Uganda